John Morrow Simms  (23 November 1854 – 29 April 1934) was a Presbyterian minister and unionist politician in Northern Ireland.

Born in Newtownards, Simms studied at the Belfast Academy, the Coleraine Academical Institution, Queen's University, Belfast, the University of Edinburgh and Leipzig University. In 1882, he was ordained as a Presbyterian Church in Ireland clergyman, and became a British Army chaplain in 1887. He was elected for the Ulster Unionist Party at the July 1922 North Down by-election, and when the seat was abolished later in the year, won a seat in Down, serving until the 1931 UK general election. From 1914 to 1920, he was Principal Chaplain to the Forces, and held rank relative to major-general. He subsequently became Honorary Chaplain to George V of the United Kingdom.

References

External links 
 
 

1854 births
1934 deaths
Alumni of Queen's University Belfast
Alumni of the University of Edinburgh
Members of the Parliament of the United Kingdom for County Down constituencies (1801–1922)
Royal Army Chaplains' Department officers
UK MPs 1918–1922
UK MPs 1922–1923
UK MPs 1923–1924
UK MPs 1924–1929
UK MPs 1929–1931
Ulster Unionist Party members of the House of Commons of the United Kingdom
Leipzig University alumni
Irish Unionist Party politicians
British Army generals of World War I
Presbyterian ministers from Northern Ireland
Moderators of the Presbyterian Church in Ireland